Pelmatellus brachyptera is a species of ground beetle in the genus Pelmatellus.

References

Harpalinae
Beetles described in 1974